Sungui Baseball Stadium was a multi-purpose stadium in Incheon, South Korea. It was used mostly for baseball games. The stadium held 12,000 people and was built in 1934. It was part of Incheon Sungui Sports Complex. It was demolished in late 2008 and was replaced by an Incheon Football Stadium.

See also
Incheon Football Stadium

1934 establishments in Korea
2008 disestablishments in South Korea
Defunct baseball venues
Multi-purpose stadiums in South Korea
Sports venues in Incheon
SSG Landers
Sports venues completed in 1934
Sports venues demolished in 2008
Baseball venues in South Korea
Defunct sports venues in South Korea
History of baseball in South Korea